Chaudhry Muhammad Yousaf Kaselya is a Pakistani politician who was a Member of the Provincial Assembly of the Punjab, from May 2013 to May 2018 and from August 2018 to January 2023.

Early life and education
He was born on 4 April 1974 in Vehari.

He has a degree of Master of Arts in Political Science.

Political career
He was elected to the Provincial Assembly of the Punjab as an independent candidate from Constituency PP-232 (Vehari-I) in 2013 Pakistani general election. He joined Pakistan Muslim League (N) (PML-N) in May 2013.

He was re-elected to Provincial Assembly of the Punjab as a candidate of PML-N from Constituency PP-229 (Vehari-I) in 2018 Pakistani general election.

References

Living people
Punjab MPAs 2013–2018
1974 births
People from Vehari
Pakistan Muslim League (N) MPAs (Punjab)
Punjab MPAs 2018–2023